Konovalov, or Konovalova (feminine), is a Russian-language surname derived from the occupation of  konoval [ коновал ], an archaic term for "veterinarian".

Notable people with this surname include:

Konovalov 
 Aleksandr Konovalov (politician, born 1875) (1875–1948), Russian politician and entrepreneur, former Russian Minister of Trade and Industry (1917)
 Aleksandr Konovalov (politician, born 1968) (born 1968), Russian politician and lawyer, former Russian Minister of Justice (2008-2020)
 Andrei Konovalov (born 1974), Russian footballer
 Dmitri Konovalov (1856–1929), Soviet physical chemist
 Ilya Konovalov (born 1971), Russian hammer thrower
 Ilya Konovalov (born 1998), Russian hockey player
 Nikita Konovalov (born 1988), Russian swimmer
 Pavel Konovalov (sprinter) (born 1960), Soviet sprinter
 Pavel Konovalov (canoeist) (born 1967), Russian canoeist
 Serge Konovalov (1941–2003), an archbishop of Western Europe of the Ecumenical Patriarchate of the Eastern Orthodox church (1981-2003)
 Serhiy Konovalov (born 1972), Ukrainian footballer
 Valentin Konovalov (born 1987), Russian politician and head of Khakassia
 Vitaliy Konovalov (1932–2013), Soviet engineer and politician
 Vladimir Konovalov (1911–1967), Soviet Navy submarine commander

Konovalova 
 Galina Konovalova (1916–2014), Russian actress
 Liliya Konovalova (1933–2015), Soviet volleyball player
 Lyudmila Konovalova (born 1968), Russian basketball player
 Mariya Konovalova (born 1974), Russian long-distance runner
 Svetlana Konovalova (born 1990), Russian paralympic cross-country skier

See also
Konovalenko
Konovalyuk
Konovalchuk
Konoval

Russian-language surnames
Occupational surnames

ru:Коновалов